Mau Tso Ngam is a village in Sha Tin District, Hong Kong.

Administration
Mau Tso Ngam is a recognized village under the New Territories Small House Policy.

History
As of 1986, Mau Tso Ngam was one of the few villages in the New Territories which were still growing and preparing their own tea in the traditional way.

See also
 Gilwell Campsite
 Kau Yeuk (Sha Tin)

References

External links

 Delineation of area of existing village Mau Tso Ngam (Sha Tin) for election of resident representative (2019 to 2022)

Villages in Sha Tin District, Hong Kong